The 2020 Estonian Football Winter Tournament or the 2020 EJL Jalgpallihalli Turniir is the fifth edition of the annual tournament in Estonia.  This tournament is divided into 5 groups of 7 teams.

Group A
 Here participating premium teams from 1st to 6th in the league.

Group B
 Here participating teams ranked 7th to 10th in the Premium League, Premium leagues from 2nd league and transition teams.

Group C

Group D

Group E

Group F

Group G

Women
 This year was only one match.

Goalscorers
3 goals

  Otto-Robert Lipp

2 goals

  Sander Puri
  Joonas Soomre
  Selim El Aabchi

1 goal

  Marcelin Gando
  Jevgeni Baranov
  Alger Džumadil
  Trevor Elhi
  Eduard Golovljov
  Vitali Gussev
  Peeter Klein
  Sander Laht
  Vadim Mihhailov
  Erki Mõttus
  Märten Opp
  Rainer Peips
  Albert Prosa
  Sten Reinkort
  Mark Oliver Roosnupp
  Raivo Saar
  Kristen Saarts
  Tauno Tekko
  Ronaldo Tiismaa
  Denis Vnukov
  Semen Belyakov
  Nikita Dronov

1 own goal
  Maksim Krivoshein

References

External links
Home page 

Winter
Estonian Football Winter Tournament